The 1929 Tulane Green Wave football team represented Tulane University as a member of the Southern Conference (SoCon) during the 1929 college football season. Led by third-year head coach Bernie Bierman and captain Bill Banker, the Green Wave posted a 9–0, undefeated record and outscored opponents 297–45. Tulane compiled a mark of 6–0 in conference play, winning the SoCon title.

Before the season
The team would feature a veteran backfield of quarterback Dick Baumbach, halfbacks Ike Armstrong and captain Bill Banker, and fullbacks Fred Seeuws and Jack Pizzano.

Schedule

Season summary

Louisiana Normal
In the season opener against Louisiana Normal (today Northwestern State), Tulane won  40–6.

The starting lineup was Holland (left end), McCanse (left tackle), Bodenger (left guard), Upton (center), Roberts (right guard), Rucker (right tackle), Dalrymple (right end), Baumbach (quarterback), Armstrong (left halfback), Banker (right halfback), Seeuws (fullback).

Texas A&M
After leading at the half 7–2, Tulane allowed the Texas A&M Aggies to take the lead 8–7. A pass from Ike Armstrong to Wop Glover in the last quarter got the win. After a safety, Tulane won 13–10.

The starting lineup was Holland (left end), McCanse (left tackle), Bodenger (left guard), Upton (center), Roberts (right guard), Rucker (right tackle), Dalrymple (right end), Baumbach (quarterback), Armstrong (left halfback), Banker (right halfback), Seeuws (fullback).

Mississippi A&M
In the third week of play, Tulane defeated the Mississippi Aggies 34–0. The starting lineup was Holland (left end), McCanse (left tackle), Bodenger (left guard), Roberts (center), Upton (right guard), Rucker (right tackle), Dalrymple (right end), Baumbach (quarterback), Armstrong (left halfback), Banker (right halfback), Seeuws (fullback).

Southwestern Louisiana

Sources:

The Green Wave romped 60–0 over Southwestern Louisiana. The starting lineup was Holland (left end), McCanse (left tackle), Bodenger (left guard), Roberts (center), Upton (right guard), Rucker (right tackle), Dalrymple (right end), Baumbach (quarterback), Armstrong (left halfback), Banker (right halfback), Seeuws (fullback).

Georgia Tech
During the game with Georgia Tech, Banker wore a helmet onto the field because coach Bernie Bierman threatened to yank him out of the game. But the helmet slipped over his eyes as the Yellow Jackets were preparing to kickoff, so Banker tossed it to the sideline, and was never taken out, calling Bierman's bluff. Tulane went on to win 20–14.

The starting lineup was Holland (left end), McCanse (left tackle), Bodenger (left guard), Roberts (center), Upton (right guard), Rucker (right tackle), Dalrymple (right end), Baumbach (quarterback), Armstrong (left halfback), Banker (right halfback), Seeuws (fullback).

Georgia

Sources:

The Green Wave defeated Georgia, conquerors of Yale, in Columbus 21–15, twice coming from behind. For the first score, end Vernon "Catfish" Smith nailed Bill Banker behind the line for a safety. After Tulane blocked a punt, Banker put in a touchdown for the lead.

Tulane's second touchdown came on a 62-yard run from Ike Armstrong. Georgia's Smith next caught a pass and went 20 yards to the goal. Georgia went ahead 15–14 after Ripper Roberts intercepted a pass and ran 60 yards for the touchdown. Tulane won on an ensuing 80-yard drive,  in a 2-yard run from Banker.

The starting lineup was Holland (left end), McCanse (left tackle), Boenger (left guard), Robert (center), McCormick (right guard), Luker (right tackle), Dalrymple (right end), Baumbach (quarterback), Armstrong (left halfback), Banker (right halfback), Seeuws (fullback).

Auburn
All of the reserves got to play in the 52–0 romp over Auburn. The starting lineup was Holland (left end), McCanse (left tackle), Bodenger (left guard), Roberts (center), Upton (right guard), Rucker (right tackle), Dalrymple (right end), Baumbach (quarterback), Armstrong (left halfback), Banker (right halfback), Seeuws (fullback).

Sewanee
Tulane defeated the Sewanee Tigers 18–0. The starting lineup was Holland (left end), McCanse (left tackle), Bodenger (left guard), Roberts (center), McCormick (right guard), Rucker (right tackle), Dalrymple (right end), Baumbach (quarterback), Banker (left halfback), Armstrong (right halfback), Seeuws (fullback).

LSU
The Green Wave won 21–0 over rival LSU. The first touchdown came on a pass from backer to Armstrong. Jerry Dalrymple scored the next touchdown, snatching a pass from Armstrong and running more than half the field for a score.  Preacher Roberts returned an interception for the final score.

Postseason
Roberts' performance in the LSU game netted him next year's captaincy. Roberts was selected All-Southern.

Tulane won the SoCon, and was invited to the Rose Bowl.

Players

Depth chart
The following chart provides a visual depiction of Tulane's lineup during the 1929 season with games started at the position reflected in parenthesis. The chart mimics a single wing on offense.

Line

Backfield

Unlisted

References

Bibliography
 

Tulane
Southern Conference football champion seasons
Tulane Green Wave football seasons
College football undefeated seasons
Tulane Green Wave football